Austin Jay Knickerbocker (October 15, 1918 – February 18, 1997) was an American professional baseball player whose 11-season career included 21 Major League games played for the Philadelphia Athletics during the  season.

Career
Born in Bangall, a hamlet of Stanford, New York, Knickerbocker attended Duke University and began his professional career at age 21 in 1940. In 1941, he batted .406 to lead the Class C Canadian–American League in hitting; he also paced the circuit in hits (202) and runs batted in (135), as a member of the Oneonta Indians. (However, Leon Riley of the Rome Colonels led the league in home runs that season.) The performance earned Knickerbocker a promotion all the way to the top level of the minors, with the 1942 Jersey City Giants, but he played only 30 games that season, then spent 1943–1945 serving in the United States Army during World War II.

He resumed his playing career in the International League in 1946 and the following year made his only Major League appearances. In his April 19, 1947, debut for the Athletics, he was a pinch runner against the Boston Red Sox, and mostly languished on the bench in the early weeks of the campaign, getting only five at bats before the May cutdown date, when he was optioned to the Triple-A Toronto Maple Leafs. After batting .278 in 105 games for Toronto that season, he was recalled by Philadelphia in September and started eight games, playing all three outfield positions through season's end. He resumed his minor league career in 1948 and played through 1954, with the exception of the 1952 season.

In 48 Major League at bats, Knickerbocker registered 12 hits, including three doubles and two triples. He scored eight runs in his 21 games.

References

External links

1918 births
1997 deaths
Allentown Wings players
Baltimore Orioles (IL) players
Baseball players from New York (state)
Duke Blue Devils baseball players
Jersey City Giants players
Major League Baseball outfielders
Mayfield Clothiers players
Oneonta Indians players
Olean Giants players
Olean Oilers managers
People from Stanford, New York
Philadelphia Athletics players
San Antonio Missions players
Syracuse Chiefs players
Toledo Mud Hens players
Toronto Maple Leafs (International League) players
Wausau Timberjacks players